Michele Magrin (born 6 November 1985) is an Italian former professional footballer who played as a midfielder.

Career 
A youth product of local club Atalanta, having joined in 1997, Magrin moved to Monza in 2004, helping them gain promotion to Serie C1. He joined Serie C2 outfit Pro Vercelli in January 2007, playing three seasons, before moving to Pro Sesto, also in Serie C2, in 2009.

Personal life 
Magrin's father, Marino, was also a professional footballer, having mostly played for Atalanta.

A singer in his free time, Magrin began aged 14. He formed the band "Amusia", and composed Monza's official club anthem "Monza Alè" in 2006.

References

External links 
 
 

1985 births
Living people
Footballers from Bergamo
Italian footballers
Association football midfielders
Atalanta B.C. players
A.C. Monza players
F.C. Pro Vercelli 1892 players
Pro Sesto 2013 players
U.S. 1913 Seregno Calcio players
U.S.D. Caravaggio players
F.C.D. Sporting Bellinzago players
Virtus Bergamo Alzano Seriate 1909 players
S.S.D. Varese Calcio players
S.S.D. Sanremese Calcio players
A.C. Crema 1908 players
Serie C players
Serie D players